Springtail Bluff is the steep, south-facing bluff that borders the eastern half of Mount Hemphill, in the Anare Mountains. So named by the northern party of New Zealand Geological Survey Antarctic Expedition (NZGSAE), 1963–64, for the find of small insects (Collembola) in this location.

Reference 

Cliffs of Victoria Land
Pennell Coast